383rd or 383d may refer to:

383d Bombardment Group, inactive United States Air Force unit
383d Bombardment Squadron or 133d Air Refueling Squadron, unit of the New Hampshire Air National Guard 157th Air Refueling Wing
383d Fighter Squadron, inactive United States Air Force unit
383rd Rifle Division (Soviet Union), a formation of the Red Army created during the Second World War

See also
383 (disambiguation)